Pseudocryptothrips is a genus of thrips in the family Phlaeothripidae.

Species
 Pseudocryptothrips fuscicauda
 Pseudocryptothrips gradatus
 Pseudocryptothrips meridionalis

References

Phlaeothripidae
Thrips
Thrips genera